Patrice Pavis (born 1947) was Professor for Theatre Studies at the University of Kent in Canterbury, England  (UK), where he retired at the end of the academic year 2015/16. He has written extensively about performance, focusing his study and research mainly in semiology and interculturalism in theatre. He was awarded the Georges Jamati Prize in 1986.

Academic Positions

Patrice Pavis was previously Professor of Theatre Studies at Paris VIII University.

Concept of "verbo-corps"

In 1987, Pavis suggested a new theory regarding the translation of dramatic works. The idea of 'verbo-corps' has been described as "highly theoretical" and criticized for leaving "a gap between theory and translatory practice which cannot be closed". The theory suggests a culture-specific union between language and gesture used subconsciously by every writer. Pavis suggested that the translator needed to be able to comprehend the union in the original and reconstruct it in the translation.

Mahābhārata

When director Peter Brook produced his collaboration of Mahābhārata with Jean-Claude Carrière, Pavis criticized the  adaptation of the Indian epic for promoting a cultural "Disney homogenization and uniformity".

Published works

 Problèmes de sémiologie théâtrale, Presses de l'Université du Québec (1976)
 Languages of the Stage: Essays in the Semiology of Theatre, PAJ Publications (1982)
 Voix et images de la scène: vers une sémiologie de la réception, Presses universitaires de Lille (1985)
 Marivaux à l'épreuve de la scène, Université de Paris-III (1986)
 Dictionnaire du Theatre, Messidors/Editions Sociales (1987)
 Le théâtre au croisement des cultures, Jose Corti (1990)
 The Intercultural Performance Reader, Routledge (1996) (Ed.)
 L'analyse des spectacles: théâtre, mime, danse, danse-théâtre, cinéma, Armand Colin (2005)
 La mise en scène contemporaine: origines, tendances, perspectives, Armand Colin (2007)
 Dictionnaire de la performance et du théâtre contemporain, Armand Colin (2014)

References

External links
 Patrice Pavis profile at the University of Kent website

Living people
Academics of the University of Kent
Theatrologists
1947 births